The 2006 United States Senate election in Massachusetts was held November 7, 2006. Incumbent Democrat Ted Kennedy won re-election to his ninth (his eighth full) term. This would be Kennedy's last election to the Senate; he died three years later of brain cancer, with which he was diagnosed in 2008. Senator Kennedy was the fourth longest-serving Senator in U.S. history, having served for nearly 47 years.

Republican primary

Candidates 
 Kenneth Chase, language school owner and activist
 Kevin Scott, businessman and former Wakefield Selectman

Campaign 
At the Massachusetts Republican Party Convention Kenneth Chase received the official endorsement with a majority of delegates, though both candidates qualified for the September primary. Former White House Chief-of-Staff Andrew Card also received 3 votes.

Results

General election

Candidates 
 Ted Kennedy (D), incumbent U.S. Senator since 1962
 Kenneth Chase (R), language school owner and Republican activist

Predictions

Polling

Results 

Kennedy won every county in the state, winning at least 60% in each county. Kennedy served his ninth, and final, term until his death on August 25, 2009 (here, the completion of John Kennedy's unexpired term is considered to be Ted Kennedy's first term).

Results by county

See also 
 2006 United States Senate elections

References

External links 
 Ted Kennedy official campaign site
 Kevin Scott official campaign site

United States Senate
2006
Massachusetts